Bad Guy, alternately titled N001, is the debut studio album by South Korean pop and R&B singer Rain, released via JYP Entertainment on May 13, 2002. The album was the 45th best-selling album of the year with over 138,000 copies sold. It won Rain various newcomer awards including at the MAMA Awards, Golden Disc Awards and Seoul Music Awards.

Commercial performance 
Commercially, Bad Guy achieved moderate levels of success in South Korea in terms of sales, where it debuted at number 19 on the monthly album chart for May 2002 with 20,800 copies sold. It rose to a peak of number 9 in August, with total sales of 68,445 copies since its release. On the year-end chart issue for 2002, Bad Guy ranked as the 45th best-selling album of the year with 138,125 copies in sales. The figure rose to 143,414 copies by January of the following year.

Accolades

Track listing

Charts

Monthly charts

Year-end charts

References

Rain (entertainer) albums
JYP Entertainment albums
2002 debut albums
Korean-language albums